Arisaema flavum is a species of flowering plant widespread across north-eastern Africa and southern Asia. It is native to Ethiopia, Somalia, the Arabian Peninsula, Pakistan, Afghanistan, Nepal, Assam, Himalayas, Tibet, Yunnan, and Sichuan. The species epithet flavum is Latin for yellow and indicates its flower colour.

Description
The throat is dark purple and have oblong-ovate limb, which is also either yellow or green coloured. The limb is also accumulate, inside of which its dark purple in colour and is slightly incurved. Female basal part have ovaries and is greenish in colour. The species' appendix is very short and is yellowish-green in colour. Flowers have 2 anthers which are 2-loculed. The flowers blooming from June to July which are being pollinated by flies.

Taxonomy
Arisaema flavum is a monotypic member of Arisaema sect. Dochafa . The section is distinguished by subglobose tubers, 1-2 leaves with a pedate leaf blade, a small spathe, and nodding inflorescence.

Uses
It is a famine food, eaten during periods of crop failure or famine in the Konso special woreda, where it is endemic. It is preferred to other species of Arisaema due to its relatively acceptable taste, can be prepared within a short time, and is less perishable. But all varieties must be crushed and dried prior to further preparation. The dried parts are then ground to powder, which is mixed with water and cooked like maize for approximately 30 minutes.

References

flavum
Flora of Northeast Tropical Africa
Flora of Asia
Plants described in 1775
Edible plants